Perry Heights is a historical neighborhood in the Oak Lawn area of Dallas, Texas (USA). As one of the last remaining single-family neighborhoods in the Dallas uptown area, Perry Heights consists of five streets of residential real estate with neighborhood restaurants and bars within walking distance. From Hawthorne Avenue in the Northwest, Cedar Springs Road in the Southwest, Wycliff Avenue in the Southeast, and Rawlins Street in the Northeast, Perry Heights was developed in 1922 by wealthy oil man, E. Gordon Perry.
It is bounded by Hawthorne Avenue on the northwest, Rawlins Street on the northeast, Wycliff Avenue on the southeast, and Vandelia Street on the southwest.

Education 
The neighborhood is served by the Dallas Independent School District. Children in the neighborhood attend Sam Houston Elementary School, Thomas J. Rusk Middle School, and North Dallas High School.

Nearby private schools include Holy Trinity Catholic School.

References

External links 
 

https://perryheights.org/

Perry Heights Neighborhood Association